Kerpen is a village in North Rhine-Westphalia.

Kerpen may also refer to:

 Kerpen (surname)
 Kerpen, Rhineland-Palatinate, village in Rhineland-Palatinate
 Kierpień, in Upper Silesia